Jens Jurn Streutker (born 23 February 1993) is a Dutch footballer who plays as a centre back for SC Genemuiden in the Dutch Hoofdklasse.

He formerly played for SC Heerenveen and on loan for Heracles Almelo and MVV Maastricht, before moving to Harkemase Boys in 2016.

References

External links
 Voetbal International profile 

1993 births
Living people
Dutch footballers
SC Heerenveen players
Heracles Almelo players
MVV Maastricht players
FC Emmen players
Eredivisie players
Eerste Divisie players
People from Hoogeveen
Association football central defenders
Harkemase Boys players
Derde Divisie players
Vierde Divisie players
SC Genemuiden players
Footballers from Drenthe